Taoufik Mehedhebi (born 13 December 1965) is a Tunisian former footballer. He competed in the men's tournament at the 1988 Summer Olympics.

References

External links
 
 

1965 births
Living people
Tunisian footballers
Tunisia international footballers
Olympic footballers of Tunisia
Stade Tunisien players
Footballers at the 1988 Summer Olympics
Place of birth missing (living people)
Association football midfielders
AS Mégrine players